Thomas Keillor (July 1, 1828 – February 5, 1907) was a farmer, Baptist minister and political figure in Nova Scotia. He represented Queens County in the Nova Scotia House of Assembly from 1897 to 1901 as a Liberal member.

He was born in Amherst, Nova Scotia, the son of Robert Keillor and Elethusia Dobson. Keillor was married three times: to Emmaline Freeman in 1865, then to O. T. Barteaux and finally to the widow Carrie Nickerson (née Jones) in January 1907. A month after his third marriage, Keillor died in Buffalo, New York, after going there to seek medical treatment.

References 
 A Directory of the Members of the Legislative Assembly of Nova Scotia, 1758-1958, Public Archives of Nova Scotia (1958)

1828 births
1907 deaths
Nova Scotia Liberal Party MLAs
Canadian Baptists
19th-century Baptists